YSO may refer to:

 Yale Symphony Orchestra
 Young stellar object
 Postville Airport, Postville, Labrador, Canada (IATA airport code)